Materials Science and Engineering R: Reports is a monthly peer-reviewed scientific journal. It is the review section of Materials Science and Engineering and is published by Elsevier. It was established in 1993, when the journal Materials Science Reports was split into Materials Science and Engineering C and Materials Science and Engineering R: Reports.

According to the Journal Citation Reports, Materials Science and Engineering R: Reports has a 2020 impact factor of 36.214, ranking it 3rd out of out of 160 in the category Physics, Applied.

References

External links
 

Physics review journals
Materials science journals
Elsevier academic journals
Publications established in 1993
English-language journals
Monthly journals